The Mantanani Islands form a small group of three  islands off the north-west coast of the state of Sabah, Malaysia, opposite the town of Kota Belud, in northern Borneo.  The largest island is Mantanani Besar; the other two are Mantanani Kecil and Lungisan.  It is a popular site for recreational diving and is known for its dugongs.

The name of the island is a compound of Ubian word "manta" (blanket) and "Nani" (the name of a mighty man who fought the enemies that owned the blanket).

Birdwatching
For birdwatchers, the Mantanani Islands are great for seeing birds that usually nest on islands, because of their relative lack of terrestrial predators, and are rarely or unpredictably seen on the mainland. There are several trails through the centre of the Mantanani Besar island in addition to open beaches along the coasts where birds can be spotted.
Mantanani Besar is the only place in Malaysia to see the Mantanani scops owl. The islands are also home to four breeding pigeon species that include the Pied imperial-pigeon, Grey imperial-pigeon, Pink-necked green pigeon and Metallic pigeon. An additional two pigeon species visit the island occasionally from the mainland and they include the Nicobar pigeon and the Black-naped fruit dove. Emerald Doves can also be seen on the island. Mantanani Besar is also home to the Philippine megapode, which thrives in the coastal forests. Three species of sunbird has been recorded on the islands; the Brown-throated sunbird, the Red-throated sunbird and the Olive-backed sunbird. The Blue-naped parrot is locally extinct.
Lungisan Island has a nesting cave colony of German's swiftlets and is an important roost for three species of frigatebirds. Other seabirds that can be seen around the islands is the Brown booby and the Black-naped tern.

Transportation
The islands are accessible by a one-hour speedboat journey from Kuala Abai jetty, Kota Belud, 80 km north-east of Kota Kinabalu, the capital of Sabah.  Sometimes, due to the storm weather, the islands could be not accessible at all for tourists. Mantanani Besar contains a number of small resorts, catering mainly to scuba divers, and Mantanani Kechil has a small dive lodge.

See also
 List of islands of Malaysia

References

Sources
 
 

Islands of Sabah
Underwater diving sites in Malaysia
Birdwatching sites
Tourist attractions in Sabah